Laura may refer to:

People
 Laura (given name)
 Laura, the British code name for the World War I Belgian spy Marthe Cnockaert

Places

Australia
 Laura, Queensland, a town on the Cape York Peninsula
 Laura, South Australia
 Laura Bay, a bay on Eyre Peninsula
 Laura Bay, South Australia, a locality
Laura Bay Conservation Park, a protected area
 Laura River (Queensland)
 Laura River (Western Australia)

Canada
 Laura, Saskatchewan

Italy
 Laura (Capaccio), a village of the municipality of Capaccio, Campania
 Laura, Crespina Lorenzana, a village in Tuscany

Marshall Islands
 Laura, Marshall Islands, an island town in the Majuro Atoll of the Marshall Islands

Poland
 Laura, Silesian Voivodeship, a village in the administrative district of Gmina Toszek, within Gliwice County, Silesian Voivodeship, in southern Poland

United States
 Laura, Illinois
 Laura, Indiana
 Laura, Kentucky, a city
 Laura, Missouri
 Laura, Ohio, a small village

Arts, media, and entertainment

Arts
 Laura (Giorgione), a 1506 painting by the Italian Renaissance master Giorgione

Characters
 Laura, a character on the U.K. television show Hollyoaks
 Laura, a character in the video game Street Fighter
 Laura, a character in the American television series The Walking Dead
Laura Palmer, a character in the American television series Twin Peaks and related media

Films
 Laura (1944 film), an American film noir directed by Otto Preminger and starring Gene Tierney
 Laura (1955 film), a 1955 American television film for The 20th Century-Fox Hour
 Laura (1968 film), a 1968 American television film
 Laura, les ombres de l'été, a French romantic drama film written and directed by photographer David Hamilton
 , a 1987 Spanish film

Literature
 Laura (novel), detective novel by Vera Caspary
 Laura, muse of Petrarch's poetry
 Laura: A Novel You Will Never Forget, a novel by Irish Minister for Justice Alan Shatter
Laura, Voyage dans le cristal, an 1864 novel by George Sand

Music

Bands
 Laura (band), an Australian post-rock band
 Oh Laura, a Swedish indie band formerly known as Laura

Albums
 Laura (Laura Pausini album), 1994
 Laura (Menudo album), 1978
 Laura, a 2004 album by Troy Gregory

Songs
 "Laura" (1945 song), a song by David Raksin and Johnny Mercer adapted from the 1944 film's theme
 "Laura" (Bat for Lashes song)
 "Laura" (Billy Joel song), a song by Billy Joel from the 1982 album The Nylon Curtain
 "Laura" (Scissor Sisters song), 2003
 "Laura" (What's He Got That I Ain't Got), a 1976 song by Kenny Rogers
 "Laura non c'è", a song by the Italian singer Nek in 1997
 "Laura", a 1977 song by the Catalan singer-songwriter Lluís Llach
 "Laura", a 1987 song by Fields of the Nephilim
 "Laura", a song by the Celtic-Punk band Flogging Molly
 "Laura", a song by indie rock group Girls
 "Laura", a 1986 song composed by Jean-Jacques Goldman
 "Laura", a song by Nick Heyward from Haircut 100 in 1985
 "Laura", a song performed by Billy Joel on his album The Nylon Curtain
 "Laura", a song by the British shoegazing band Lush
 "Laura", a song by the tejano band Mazz
 "Laura", a song by Jimmy Nail in 1992
 "Laura," a parody of the 1945 song performed by Spike Jones and His Other Orchestra
 "When Laura smiles", a madrigal by English composer Thomas Campion

Television
 "Laura" (Fear the Walking Dead), an episode of the American television series Fear the Walking Dead
 Laura (TV series), a TV program hosted by Laura Bozzo (also known as Laura en América, Laura sin censura, Laura en acción, and Laura de todos)
 "Laura", an episode of the television show Magnum, P.I., guest starring Frank Sinatra
 Laura Carrot, a character in the direct-to-video series VeggieTales

Transportation
 Aichi E11A, Imperial Japanese Navy flying boat code-named "Laura" by the allies
 Laura (1835 steamboat), 1835 steamboat built in Louisville, Kentucky, United States
 Škoda Laura, a small family car
 , a number of steamships with this name

Other
 467 Laura, an asteroid
 Laura Airport, Laura, Queensland, Australia
 Laura (clothing retailer), a chain of Canadian women's fashions
 Laura (crustacean), a genus of maxillopoda
 Laura potato, a cultivar of potato
 Laura or lavra (Greek: Λαύρα, Cyrillic: Лавра), a cluster of cells or caves used by hermits, loosely connected into a community
 List of storms named Laura, a list of tropical cyclones designated as Laura
 Hurricane Laura, a destructive Category 4 hurricane that made landfall in Louisiana in 2020

See also
 Laura River (disambiguation)
 Laurel (given name)
 Laurentius (disambiguation)

 Laure (disambiguation)
 Lauren (disambiguation)
 Lauria (disambiguation)
 Laurie (disambiguation)
 Lora (disambiguation)

 Laur (surname)
 Lara (disambiguation)
 Lauer (disambiguation)

 Lauras – Lauralee – Laurance

 List of storms named Laura

Disambiguation pages with given-name-holder lists